General Fernández Oro is a small train station located in the homonymous city in the General Roca Department in Río Negro Province, Argentina. It opened on August 1, 1899 as "Km. 1,181", and then renamed after General Manuel Fernández Oro (1848–1910), who took part in the Conquest of the Desert. It features the typical architectural design of stations built by Ferrocarriles del Sud at the end of the 19th century.

The station is located on Provincial Route 65, 1,181 km at General Fernández Oro city, one of the cities in the Alto Valle valley (along the Río Negro river). Towards the East, the next station is Allen; towards the West, the next station is Cipolletti. General Fernández Oro is part of the Bahía Blanca-Zapala line of General Roca Railway. Since 1993 the line has carried only freight services, being currently operated by private company Ferrosur Roca.

History 
In Argentina, many towns were founded around railway stations. General Fernández Oro railway station was part of a strategic project to build a railroad to transport military personnel towards the Andes area, in view of the possibility of a military conflict with Chile.

After the station was opened, the first settlers (mainly immigrants) arrived. By 1927, a small town surrounded the station.

After former President Perón nationalized all railways in Argentina in 1948, the railway line was renamed General Roca.

The station is nowadays the Estación Cultural Lucinda Larrosa Museum, an exhibition center first conceived as a museum of natural sciences and regional history that nowadays holds periodical artistic exhibitions.

Operators 

Notes

Gallery

See also 
 General Fernández Oro

References

External links 

 Ferrosur Roca S.A., operator
 Blog article about Estación General Fernández Oro on Horizonte Ferroviario 

f
f
f